This is a list of Houston Cougars baseball seasons. The Houston Cougars baseball program is a college baseball team that represents the University of Houston in the American Athletic Conference in the National Collegiate Athletic Association. Houston has played their home games at Schroeder Park (previously known as Cougar Field) in Houston since 1995. 

The Cougars have won 111 conference regular season championships, 8 conference tournaments, and have played in the NCAA Division I Baseball Championship 22 times, advancing to the College World Series on 2 occasions.

Season results

Notes

References

 
Houston
Houston Cougars baseball seasons
Houston Cougars baseball seasons